Wolf's Clothing is a 1936 British comedy film directed by Andrew Marton and starring Claude Hulbert, Gordon Harker and Lilli Palmer. The screenplay concerns a blundering group of secret agents who mistake a Foreign Office official for a dangerous international assassin.

It was made at Shepperton Studios by the independent producer Richard Wainwright.

Cast
 Claude Hulbert as Ambrose Girling
 Gordon Harker as Prosser
 Lilli Palmer as Lydia
 George Graves as Sir Roger Balmayne
 Peter Gawthorne as Sir Hector
 Helen Haye as Mildred Girling
 Joan Swinstead as Mary Laming
 Frank Birch as Reverend John Laming
 Ernest Sefton as Finden Charvet
 George Hayes as Yassiov
 Shayle Gardner as Babo
 Violet Gould as Kiosk Proprietress
 Madame von Major as Babo's Mother

References

Bibliography
 Low, Rachael. Filmmaking in 1930s Britain. George Allen & Unwin, 1985.
 Wood, Linda. British Films, 1927-1939. British Film Institute, 1986.

External links

1936 films
1936 comedy films
1930s English-language films
Films directed by Andrew Marton
British comedy films
British black-and-white films
1930s British films